Boyd Island is an island in Prydz Bay on the Ingrid Christensen Coast of Princess Elizabeth Land, Antarctica. It lies just SSW of Lugg Island, and about 3.5 km NNW of Australia's Davis Station on Broad Peninsula in the Vestfold Hills. It was named after Jeff J. Boyd, a Medical Officer at Davis in 1970.

Important Bird Area
The island forms part of the Magnetic Island and nearby islands Important Bird Area (IBA), comprising Magnetic, Turner, Waterhouse, Lugg, Boyd and Bluff Islands, along with other intervening islands and the marine area. The site was designated an IBA by BirdLife International because it supports large colonies of Adélie penguins totalling some 29,000 breeding pairs, based on 2012 satellite imagery.

References

 

Important Bird Areas of Antarctica
Penguin colonies
Islands of Princess Elizabeth Land